The Georgetown University Library is the library system of Georgetown University in Washington, D.C. The library's holdings now contain approximately 3.5 million volumes housed in seven university buildings across 11 separate collections.

History 
The Georgetown University Library was created with a donation of over 100 volumes of books in 1796 by Louis William Valentine Dubourg, the third President of Georgetown College.

Facilities

Lauinger Library

The library's largest building, the Joseph Mark Lauinger Memorial Library, is located on Georgetown's main campus and holds the majority of the library system's collections.

Blommer Science Library
Blommer Science Library is located in the Reiss Science building, on Georgetown's main campus. It stores materials for undergraduate and graduate study in biology, chemistry, computer science, mathematics, and physics.

Woodstock Theological Library

The Woodstock Theological Library is one of the oldest Catholic theological libraries in the United States, having been founded in 1869. The library moved to Georgetown in 1974, accompanying the Woodstock Theological Center, which closed in 2013, although the library remains in existence.

School of Continuing Studies Downtown Campus Library

The School of Continuing Studies Downtown Library opened with the move of Georgetown's School of Continuing Studies to a new Downtown campus in 2013. The library offers course reserve materials and provides a pickup location for materials from other libraries.

Bioethics Research Library
The Bioethics Research Library is located on the second floor of Healy Hall.

Dahlgren Memorial Library

Dahlgren Memorial Library provides information and digital services and resources to support faculty, staff, and students of the Georgetown University Medical Center.

Riggs Memorial Library

Riggs Memorial Library served as the main library of Georgetown between 1891 and 1970, until it was replaced by Lauinger Library. Riggs library, which is located on the third floor of Healy Hall, is one of the few existing cast-iron libraries in the country and still serves its original purpose of storing books.

Edward Bennett Williams Law Library
The Williams Law Library is the main library of the Georgetown University Law Center.

John Wolff International and Comparative Law Library
The Wolff International and Comparative Law Library is housed separately from the Williams Law Library in the Hotung International Law Center Building. Its collection focuses on primary and secondary foreign sources, with materials from Australia, Canada, France, Germany, Great Britain, Ireland, Mexico, New Zealand, Scotland, and South Africa, and other nations. It also has extensive documents from international organizations including the Permanent Court of International Justice, the League of Nations, the United Nations, European Union, International Court of Justice, World Trade Organization, GATT, and the Council of Europe.

Georgetown University School of Foreign Service in Qatar Library

Maternal and Child Health Library
The Maternal and Child Health Library was founded in 1982 and is part of the Georgetown's National Center for Education in Maternal and Child Health.

Collaborations with other library systems
Georgetown is part of the Washington Research Library Consortium, a joint initiative by nine universities in the District of Columbia which coordinates access and resources between the nine library systems. Members may borrow books from other libraries in the system and they share off-site storage, among other initiatives.

References

External links
Official website of Georgetown University Library

Libraries in Washington, D.C.
University and college academic libraries in the United States
Library